Modesto Delgado Rodas (October 2, 1886 – October 15, 1963) was a Paraguayan painter.

1880s births
1963 deaths
20th-century Paraguayan painters